Saltwater State Park is a  plot of second-growth timber on Puget Sound in the city of Des Moines, Washington, United States.

Overlooked by most visitors is the steep ravine of McSorley (formerly Smith) Creek which winds inland in a gentle "S" curve joined by three tributary streams. About 30 campsites are situated on a road that parallels the creek, serving the public on a first-come-first-served basis.  On both the north and south sides of the ravine there is a network of hiking trails which follow up the side creeks, rise through jungles of stinging nettles, skirt the edges of cliffs and ridges, and cross wooded plateaus.

As of 2009, Saltwater State Park has been designated a Marine Protected Area. Salmon spawn in McSorley Creek and the area provides habitat for many species of fish.

One trail rises between the two branches of the creek to exit the park, while another trail continues from the dead-end of the campground service road a short way east of 16th Ave. along the main branch of the creek, informally extending the park.

The Redondo turn point for jets approaching SeaTac Airport is just to the south, so the park is rather noisy, but Saltwater remains one of the most-used State Parks in the Puget Sound region with an average of 350,000 visitors a year.

References

Sources

External links

Saltwater State Park. Washington State Parks and Recreation Commission

Parks in King County, Washington
State parks of Washington (state)